Lepidapedidae is a family of trematodes belonging to the order Plagiorchiida.

Genera

Genera:
 Allolepidapedon Yamaguti, 1940
 Bulbocirrus Yamaguti, 1965
 Gibsonia Gaevskaya & Rodyuk, 1988

References

Plagiorchiida